Napoleon Manuel Kheil (19 October 1849, Prague, Bohemia – 1 November 1923 Prague, Czechoslovakia) was a Czech zoologist and  entomologist who specialised in Lepidoptera and Orthoptera.

He was the owner of a private business school and Professor and author in the field of commercial matters at the Business School in Prague.

Travels and Translations 
He explored the flora and fauna of the Sierra Nevada and other regions of Spain and translated into Czech Pedro Calderon De La Barca's play Life is a dream. Also in Czech he published some monographs related to Spain. Khiel was very talented with regards to languages. Besides Czech and Spanish, he also spoke fluent German, and French. He is buried at Olšany Cemetery in Prague.

Kheil's Collection
A collector who in his time had one of the largest private collections of insects collected in Czechoslovakia Napoleon Manuel Kheil was a member and one of the founders of the Czech Entomological Society. After his death, his collection of more than 27.000 specimen of insects was bequeathed by the Czech National Museum. It is now kept by its Entomological department.

Works
Entomology partial list

Kheil, N.M, 1884 Zur Fauna des Indo-Malayischen Archipels. Die Rhoplalocera der Insel Nias Rhopalocera Ins. Nias : [1-5], 6-38, 5pls. Berlin.R. Friedlander & Sohn. Includes a general description of the island and its inhabitants, and a list of 149 butterflies, with occasional notes on known species, and descriptions of several new ones, illustrated by photographic plates. 
Kheil, N.M., 1890 Ueber geschlechtlichen Dimorphismus des abessynischen Pap. antinorii Oberthur. Deutsche Entomologische Zeitschrift, Iris 3:333-336.   
Berliner Entomologische Zeitschrift 33:393-394.   
Memorias da Real Sociedad Espanol de Historia Natural 1:161-181. 
Kheil N. M., 1916 Die Lepidopteren der Sierra de Espana. 34 pp. International entomol. Zeitschrift 10(8): 41-74.

References
 Anonym, 1899, Národní album. Sbírka podobiznu a životopisů česká lidí. Nakl. JR Vilímek, Praha: 102, 156
 Dusmet y Alonso, J. M., 1919, Kheil Napoleon Manuel. Byl. Soc. Ent. España. 2: 182–183
 Obenberger, J.: 1923, Tři Ztráty (Napoleon Manuel Kheil). Čas. Čs. spol. ent., 20: 111–112
 Vávra, V. 1923, Napoleon Manuel Kheil. Sborník ent. odd. Nár. muz. v Praze, 2: p. 3–4
 Vávra, V. 1923, Napoleon Manuel Kheil. Čas. Nár. mus. odd. přír., 97: 143–144
 Anonym: 1954, Čas. Národ. Muzea, 123, 7
 Derksen, W., Scheiding–Göllner, U., 1965 Index litteraturae entomologicae. Německý entomologického ústav Německé akademie věd, Eberswalde bei Berlin. Serie II., Bd. I.–V. Berlin (1864–1900), II: (1965): (F–L): [Kheil, Napoleon Manuel]: 470–471
 Kolečka, Z., 1983 Zpravy Čs. spol. ent. ČSAV, Praha, 19 (5): Kheil Napoleon Manuel: 161–163
Rufino Blanco Sánchez, Elementos de literatura española..., 1925.
Gaedike, R. & Groll, E. K. eds. 2001, Entomologen der Welt (Biografien, Sammlungsverbleib). Datenbank, DEI Eberswalde im ZALF e. V.: Kheil Napoleon Manuel.online database

Czech entomologists
German lepidopterists
Czech lepidopterists
1849 births
1923 deaths
Scientists from Prague